Sophronica talhouki is a species of beetle in the family Cerambycidae. It was described by Holzschuh and Téocchi in 1991.

References

Sophronica
Beetles described in 1991